Shiri Artstein-Avidan (born 28 September 1978) is an Israeli mathematician who in 2015 won the Erdős Prize. She specializes in convex geometry and asymptotic geometric analysis, and is a professor of mathematics at Tel Aviv University.

Education and career
Artstein was born in Jerusalem, the daughter of mathematician Zvi Artstein. She graduated summa cum laude from Tel Aviv University in 2000, with a bachelor's degree in mathematics, and completed her PhD at Tel Aviv University in 2004 under the supervision of Vitali Milman, with a dissertation on Entropy Methods. She worked from 2004 to 2006 as a Veblen Research Instructor in Mathematics at Princeton University and as a researcher at the Institute for Advanced Study before returning to Tel Aviv as a faculty member in 2006.

Recognition
Artstein won the Haim Nessyahu Prize in Mathematics, an annual dissertation award of the Israel Mathematical Union, in 2006.
In 2008 she won the Krill Prize for Excellence in Scientific Research, from the
Wolf Foundation.
In 2015 she won the Anna and Lajos Erdős Prize in Mathematics. The award cited her "solution of Shannon's long standing problem on monotonicity of entropy (with K. Ball, F. Barthe and A. Naor), profound and unexpected development of the concept of duality, Legendre and Fourier transform from axiomatic viewpoint (with V. Milman) and discovery of an astonishing link between Mahler's conjecture in convexity theory and an isoperimetric-type inequality involving symplectic capacities (with R. Karasev and Y. Ostrover)".

Selected publications
 

Her research publications include:

References

External links
Home page

1978 births
Living people
Israeli mathematicians
Women mathematicians
Mathematical analysts
Tel Aviv University alumni
Academic staff of Tel Aviv University
Erdős Prize recipients